The Metropolitan City of Cagliari (Sardinian: Tzittadi metropolitana de Casteddu) is a metropolitan city in Sardinia, Italy. Its capital is the city of Cagliari and includes 17 comuni. It was established by law in 2016 and replaced the Province of Cagliari.  The current president is the mayor of Cagliari, Paolo Truzzu. The resident population is approximately 432,000. This figure can rise due to commuting into the functional urban area to approximately 477,000

Geography

The Metropolitan City of Cagliari extends over the southern part of the Campidano plain, between two mountain ranges. The Sulcis Range is to the west and includes Monti Arcosu, and Punta Sebera. To the east is the Monte Linias Range, including  and Sette Fratelli. These mountains are composed of Ordovician shale and Carboniferous granite and do not exceed .

Climate
The Metropolitan City of Cagliari has a Mediterranean climate with hot, dry Summers and mild Winters. It is unusual for Summer temperatures to rise above , often with high humidity, while in winter, the record lows are below zero. Heavy snowfalls occur rarely; on average, every thirty years. African anticyclone activity can cause heat waves starting in June. From mid-June to mid-September rain is rare and appears in afternoon storms. The rainy season starts in September, but the first cold days come in December, usually the wettest month. Winds are frequent, especially the mistral and sirocco; in Summer days a marine sirocco breeze (s'imbattu) lowers the temperature and the humidity.

On the surrounding mountains, the climate is very different with plentiful average rainfall, cold winters, and mild warm summers (Csb in the Köppen climate classification).

Metropolitan Municipalities

As 470 km2 are covered by forests, lagoons, ponds and salt marshes, the really populated area is 777.8 km2. So the real population density rises to 553 inhabitants/km2.

In 1861, the municipalities of the current metropolitan city had 67,063 inhabitants, while the city proper had 33,491. Since then the city had a population growth of 461%, while the metropolitan municipalities as an all had an increase of 644%. In that year Cagliari had a population that was the 50% of the metropolitan area, while now it is only the 36%.

Government

List of Metropolitan Mayors of Cagliari

Economy

According to 2014 data from the Ministry of Economy and Finance, the per capita income of the residents of Cagliari was 122% of the national average; for the metropolitan area it was 103% and for Sardinia as a whole it was 86%. The 26% of the island population that lives in Cagliari Metropolitan City produces 31% of the island's GDP and the urban-area income is greater than that of the rest of Sardinia. According to Eurostat in 2009 the metropolitan area of Cagliari had a per capita purchasing power standard (PPS) of 21.699 euros, which is 92.4% of the European Union (27) data.

The Metropolitan City has an unemployment rate of 17.7%. This is higher than the national rate of 12.2% and higher than the regional unemployment rate of 17.5%.

The traditional economy was based on agriculture: the cultivation of wheat, olive groves and vineyards, gardens and orchards wherever there was plenty of water in the dry Summers. The mountains were exploited for firewood and coal that were sold in Cagliari. There were mines, particularly the Iron mine of San Leone in the territory of Assemini. The large salt pans east and west of Cagliari were also exploited.

Currently the capital city holds most of the administrative offices, the retail trade (particularly in the historic center), financial services, professional offices, and health services. Industry, warehousing, and major shopping centers are concentrated in the other municipalities of the metropolitan area. Tourism is concentrated along the coast.

In 2014, the Cagliari-Sarroch port system was the third largest in Italy, as measured by amount of goods transferred.

The Macchiareddu-Grogastru area between Cagliari and Capoterra, in conjunction with the Port of Cagliari, is the most important industrial area of Sardinia. The port includes the Cagliari International Container Terminal (CICT) at Giorgino, which had an annual traffic capacity of 1,000,000 Twenty-Foot equivalent units (TEUs) in 2002. Multinational corporations like Coca-Cola, Heineken, Unilever, Bridgestone and Eni Group have factories in this area. Within the metropolitan area at Sarroch there is one of the six oil refinery supersites in Europe, called Saras.
The communications provider, Tiscali, has its headquarters in the boroughs of Cagliari.

Main sights

Churches

There are religious buildings in the metropolitan area that date back to the beginnings of the Christian presence in Sardinia. The crypts of the churches of Santa Restituta and Saint Ephysius in Cagliari are examples of cave churches officiated in the first centuries of the Christian era. The first church built after the Edict of Thessalonica of Theodosius I, who made Christianity the state religion of the Roman Empire, was the church of Saint Saturninus in Cagliari. Little now remains of the Byzantine period: the only building that survives, is the small church of San Giovanni in Assemini. However, there are many Romanesque churches, including the church of Saint Mary in Uta, and Baroque churches, such as the Shrine of Our Lady of Bonaria.

Archaeological sites

In the metropolitan area there are ruins of neolithic and chalcolithic villages, and several domus de Janas. There are also many nuraghes; the Nuraghe Diana on the coast of Quartu Sant'Elena and the nuraghes Sa Domu de S'Orcu and Antigori on the coast of Sarroch are particularly important. A deep, sacred well is located in Settimo San Pietro and a giants' grave, Is Concias, in the territory of Quartucciu.
In the city of Nora, there are ruins of the Punic and Roman periods. The Tuvixeddu necropolis and a Roman Amphitheatre are located in Cagliari.

Metropolitan forests

The metropolitan area is delimited to the east and west by high mountain ranges, largely covered by Mediterranean forests, dominated by evergreen, oak, cork oak, and arbutus. Within this forest is the WWF (World Wildlife Fund) Monte Arcosu Oasis, created to protect the subspecies of Sardinian deer (Cervus elaphus ssp. Corsicanus).

The mountain of Sette Fratelli, which is covered by the forest, is a vast massif with many crested peaks, seven of which are visible from Cagliari.

The environment of the metropolitan city varies with altitude in both temperature and precipitation. The forests are populated by Sardinian deer (Cervus elaphus corsicanus), now saved from near-extinction, the fallow deer, reintroduced after its extinction from the area, wild boars, foxes, and European pine martens.

Metropolitan beaches

In the municipalities of the metropolitan area there are numerous beaches. One of the biggest is the Poetto beach of Cagliari and Quartu Sant'Elena,  of fine sand in front of the Sella del Diavolo. To the east of Cagliari are the beaches of Geremeas (commune of Maracalagonis) and Solanas (commune of Sinnai), and to the west are the beaches of Nora and Santa Margherita (commune of Pula).The surrounding municipalities not part Metropolitan City of Villasimius, Castiadas and Domus de Maria possess some of the most famous beaches of Sardinia.

Folk customs and traditional dresses
The Sagra or feast of Saint Ephisius, 1 May, is the most gorgeous folk rite of the area. The statue of the Saint, loaded on a pompous carriage, is carried from the crypt where he was being held, to Nora where he was martyrized. Its carriage, accompanied by Sardinian militiamen, the Alter Nos (the mayor's representative), folk groups wearing traditional clothes, on foot or on elaborately decorated waggons (traccas), and finally believers, proceeds for 32 km. Thousands of people, peasants and tourists alike, attend the event. On May 4, at dusk, the saint returns to the city, in a more intimate procession.

Another folk custom is sa coja antiga ( l'antico sposalizio selargino  in Italian, or the antique selargino marriage in English), the traditional wedding ceremony typical of Selargius. Accompanied by religious songs in Sardinian language, the engaged couple approaches the altar, where they sign the marriage contract with the exchange of a love written promise that will be unveiled only after 25 years of marriage. After the ceremony, the groom puts his pinkie in the ring of a chain that surrounds the waist of the bride, an ancient token of bond.

Language
The Metropolitan City's indigenous language is Sardinian in its Campidanese variety, but it is losing ground to Italian almost everywhere.

Transportation
 CTM
 ARST
 Cagliari light rail
 Cagliari Elmas Airport
 Port of Cagliari
 Cagliari-Golfo Aranci Marittima railway
 Monserrato-Isili railway

References

External links

 

Cagliari

States and territories established in 2016